The 134th (Loyal Limerick) Regiment of Foot was an infantry regiment of the British Army, created in 1794 and disbanded in 1796. The regiment was formed in Ireland by redesignating the newly raised 2nd Battalion of the 83rd (County of Dublin) Regiment of Foot, and did not leave Ireland before being disbanded in 1796.

References

External links

Infantry regiments of the British Army
Military units and formations established in 1794
Military units and formations disestablished in 1796
Defunct Irish regiments of the British Army
History of County Limerick
1794 establishments in Great Britain